Telltale is a three-part television crime drama series set in South Wales, this series was produced by HTV Wales for the ITV Network, first aired on ITV from 10 to 24 June 1993. The drama stars Bernard Hill, Nigel Harrison, Robert Pugh and Rachel Davies, and involves an opportunist criminal puts his and his family's lives in danger when he turns supergrass.

Cast
 Bernard Hill as DS Gavin Douglas
 Nigel Harrison as DS Paul Herbert
 Robert Pugh as Billy Hodge
 Rachel Davies as Doreen Hodge
 Beth Morris as Rosie Douglas
 Melanie Walters as Jean Herbert

Episodes

References

External links

1993 British television series debuts
1993 British television series endings
1990s British crime television series
1990s British drama television series
ITV television dramas
1990s British television miniseries
British thriller television series
Television series by ITV Studios
Television shows produced by Harlech Television (HTV)
English-language television shows
Television shows set in Wales